Seesen is a town and municipality in the district of Goslar, in Lower Saxony, Germany. It is situated on the northwestern edge of the Harz mountain range, approx.  west of Goslar.

History
The Saxon settlement of Sehusa was first mentioned in a 974 deed issued by Emperor Otto II and Chancellor Willigis, from 1235 on it belonged to the Welf dukes of Brunswick-Lüneburg who had a castle erected. In 1428 Seesen received town privileges by Duke Otto II the One-Eyed of Brunswick-Göttingen. On 17 July 1810, Israel Jacobson dedicated in Seesen the first synagogue which employed an organ and a choir during prayer and introduced some German liturgy. This day is celebrated by Reform Judaism worldwide as its foundation date. In 1836 Heinrich Engelhard Steinweg (later named Henry E. Steinway) built his first grand piano in his kitchen in Seesen; the instrument is today on display at New York's Metropolitan Museum of Art.

Politics
Seats in the municipal assembly (Stadtrat) as of 2006 elections:
 Christian Democratic Union (CDU): 17
 Social Democratic Party of Germany (SPD): 15
 Free Democratic Party (FDP): 2

Twin towns – sister cities

Seesen is twinned with:
 Wantage, England, United Kingdom (1978)
 Thale, Germany (1990)
 Carpentras, France (1993)
 Montecorvino Rovella, Italy (2006)

Notable people

 Konstantin Bernhard von Voigts-Rhetz (1809–1877), Prussian general, born in Seesen
 Wilhelm Busch (1832–1908), piano manufacturer, spent his last years at the Mechtshausen vicarage
 Wilhelm Fitzenhagen (1848–1890), cellist, composer and university teacher, born in Seesen
 Israel Jacobson (1768–1828), established the first Haskalah interdenominational school in Germany at Seesen in 1801
 Louis Spohr (1784–1859), composer that spent his childhood at Seesen
 William Steinway, Piano manufacturer that was born at Seesen on 5 March 1835 as Wilhelm Steinweg. His father Henry E. Steinway (Heinrich Engelhard Steinweg) built his first grand piano at a Seesen washkitchen in 1836
 Emil Wohlwill (1835–1912), chemist, born at Seesen

See also
Metropolitan region Hannover-Braunschweig-Göttingen-Wolfsburg

References

Towns in the Harz
Duchy of Brunswick